Maxey Martin Holmes (24 December 1908 – 1999) was an English professional footballer who played as a winger.

References

1908 births
1999 deaths
People from South Holland (district)
English footballers
Association football wingers
Spalding United F.C. players
Grimsby Town F.C. players
Hull City A.F.C. players
Mansfield Town F.C. players
Lincoln City F.C. players
English Football League players